Kate Kelton is a Canadian film and television actress and an artist, who had a recurring role on Syfy's Haven from 2012 to 2013. Kelton has also had leading roles in music videos as well as a long-running international commercial for Tic Tac.

Personal life and education

Kelton was born in Bamberg, Germany to Czech parents. Her mother is an artist and her adopted father was an architect. Kelton is the great-granddaughter of Czech architect Josef Fanta. Settling in Toronto when she was seven, Kelton attended the Etobicoke School of the Arts and received a Bachelor of Applied Arts in film from Ryerson University. She began her career as an artist before moving into acting.

Art career

Kelton's artwork is exhibited internationally, including at La Luz de Jesus Gallery and Gallery1988 in Los Angeles and New York, and Galerie F in Chicago. She has posed for artist Jason Shawn Alexander in the lead role of Corrine for his comic book series, Empty Zone. Kelton is a contributing author to Making It in High Heels: Inspiring Stories by Women for Women of All Ages. In 2019, her series SENTRY debuted in Los Angeles at Cactus Gallery. The series takes embellishments of a Prague train station designed by her great-grandfather, Josef Fanta, and combines these with portraits of women who came forward about sexual harassment and abuse in the entertainment industry- theSilence Breakers.

Commercial career

Kelton played the "Tic Tac Girl" appearing in Tic Tac mints television commercials for almost a decade throughout Canada, Australia, South Africa and Israel.

Film
 
Kelton's feature film debut was in Harold & Kumar Go to White Castle. Kelton has also appeared in several independent films.

Television
Her first series leading role on television was opposite Eric Roberts and Eddie Izzard, as Martine, in IFC's Bullet in the Face.

Music video
Kelton starred in numerous music videos, including Shaggy's "It Wasn’t Me" and Eric Clapton’s "Can’t Let You Do It."

References

Canadian female models
Canadian film actresses
Canadian television actresses
Canadian people of Czech descent
German emigrants to Canada
Living people
People from Bamberg
Toronto Metropolitan University alumni
Canadian expatriates in Germany
Year of birth missing (living people)